Patricia Dobler (June 18, 1939 – July 24, 2004) was an American poet and winner of the Brittingham Prize in Poetry.

Life
Patricia Averdick was born in Middletown, Ohio on June 18, 1939, and completed her BA in political science at St. Xavier College in Chicago. In 1961, she married the writer Bruce Dobler, and relocated with him to Iowa City; Exeter, New Hampshire; Putney, Vermont; Anchorage, Alaska; Tucson, Arizona; El Paso, Texas; and finally Pittsburgh, Pennsylvania as he advanced through his academic and writing career.

After raising two daughters, Stephanie and Lisa, Patricia Dobler completed her MFA at the University of Pittsburgh, where she studied poetry with Ed Ochester, Lynn Emanuel, and Louis Simpson. In 1986, her book was chosen by poet Maxine Kumin to receive the Brittingham Prize in Poetry from the University of Wisconsin–Madison. That same year, Dobler joined the faculty of Carlow University, where she founded and directed its Women's Creative Writing Center, a position she held until her death in 2004. Dobler was also a popular leader of Carlow's non-degree writing workshop, Madwomen in the Attic. Her final book, Collected Poems, was published posthumously by the Autumn House Press in 2005.

Death and interment
She died July 24, 2004 at her home in Pittsburgh. She is interred in the Roman Catholic Calvary Cemetery in the city's Greenfield and Hazelwood neighborhoods.

Works
 Collected Poems, poetry (Pittsburgh: Autumn House Press, 2005)
 UXB, poetry  (Pittsburgh: Mill Hunk Books, 1991)
 Talking To Strangers, poetry (Madison: University of Wisconsin Press, 1986)
 Forget Your Life, poetry chapbook (Omaha: University of Nebraska Press, 1982)

References
Notes

Sources
Bob Hoover (2005). Pittsburgh Post-Gazette: Obituary of Patricia Dobler. Retrieved April 18, 2006.

1939 births
2004 deaths
Burials at Calvary Catholic Cemetery (Pittsburgh)
University of Pittsburgh alumni
Writers from Pittsburgh
American women poets
20th-century American poets
20th-century American women writers
21st-century American women